The Anglican Diocese of Nike is one of the 12 Anglican Diocese within the Anglican Province of Enugu, which is itself one of 14 provinces within the Church of Nigeria.

The Diocese was inaugurated on 18 April 2007 as the 116th diocese in the Church of Nigeria. The inaugural bishop was Evans Jonathan Ibeagha and the current incumbent is Christian Onyia.

Notes

Church of Nigeria dioceses
Dioceses of the Province of Enugu